Noordhoek may refer to:

 Noordhoek, Cape Town, South Africa
 Noordhoek, Bloemfontein, South Africa
 Noordhoek (Rucphen), a location in North Brabant, the Netherlands
 Noordhoek, Moerdijk, the Netherlands